Yellow Dust is a 1936 American Western film directed by Wallace Fox from a screenplay by Cyril Hume, John Twist, and John Francis Larkin. The film stars Richard Dix and Leila Hyams, with a supporting cast including Moroni Olsen, Jessie Ralph, Andy Clyde, and Onslow Stevens. RKO Radio Pictures premiered the film in New York City on February 22, 1936, with a nationwide release on March 13.

Plot
The film opens in the hills of California. Bob Culpepper is a college-educated man from Tennessee, who has chosen the life of a gold prospector. Culpepper witnesses veteran prospector Silas "Solitaire" Carter getting attacked by an intruder and comes to his defense. The fight results in the intruder's death and the two new allies decide to bury him. While digging for the grave, they discover a gold-bearing vein. They use the vein to calculate that there is a mother lode of gold in a nearby mountain. Eager to profit from their discovery, Carter and Culpepper head to the nearest town to make a land claim for this area.

Before reaching the town, the two partners witness a gang of outlaws who are in the process of robbing a stagecoach. They decide to help the victims and manage to scare off the gang. Among the passengers is a lovely saloon singer, Nellie Brian, and Culpepper is instantly smitten with her. Brian is also attracted to him, but her mother urges her to focus on her next singing gig.

At the town, Brian entertains her new boss, Jack Hanway. He is the prosperous owner of a local saloon. Neither Brian, nor her mother realize that Hanway is secretly the leader of the gang of outlaws. Brian eventually confesses her love to Culpepper, and also talks to him about a valuable necklace which the outlaws had stolen from her. Culpepper locates the necklace, at the hands of an outlaw known only by the nickname "Missouri". He forces the outlaw to hand over the necklace to him.

Trying to impress Brian and outrage Culpepper, Hanway stages a robbery at his own saloon. His gang is supposed to act as robbers, and Hanway acts as the hero who bravely thwarts their plan. Culpepper figures out the plan and tries to expose Hanway as a criminal. Instead, "Missouri" accuses him of being involved with the stagecoach robbery and being in possession of the loot. With the necklace found in his possession, Culpepper is arrested as a thief and imprisoned. Brian is convinced that Culpepper is a villain.

With his rival out of the way, Hanway romances Brian. He gets careless and she overhears his plans to lay claim to the mother lode. Brian tries to alert Carter that he is in danger of losing his gold, but he is too drunk to listen to her. Brian gets another idea of how to ruin Hanway's plans. She tricks him into delaying making his land claim, then makes the claim herself. Brian is now the only one with a legal claim to the gold. Carter is shocked to find out about this development and informs Culpepper. Culpepper figures that his love interest has conspired against him and wants to retaliate. He convinces "Missouri" to help him escape from prison.

After escaping, Culpepper abducts Brian and restrains her with a straitjacket. He rides with his captive to the area with the gold. Their time together allows them to clear the misunderstandings between them and declare their own innocence. Realizing that neither of them is a villain, they reconcile and express their love for each other. When arriving at the area of the claim, they are captured by Hanway and his gang.

Hanway wants Brian for himself and proposes marriage to her. She accepts, hoping that she may use her new position to help Culpepper. Meanwhile, Carter and "Missouri" arrange a fake execution for Culpepper. They use the opportunity to escape with him back to town. They stop the wedding of Hanway and Brian in time and expose Hanway as a gang leader.

Cast
The cast of this film according to the American Film Institute, includes:
 Richard Dix as Bob Culpepper
 Leila Hyams as Nellie Brian
 Moroni Olsen as "Missouri"
 Jessie Ralph as Mrs. Brian
 Andy Clyde as Silas "Solitaire" Carter
 Onslow Stevens as Jack Hanway
 Victor Potel as Jugger
 Ethan Laidlaw as Bogan
 Ted Oliver as McLearney

Production
According to the American Film Institute, the film is based on the theatrical play Mother Lode (1934). The play was written by George O'Neil and Dan Totheroh. The working title for the film was Mother Lode.

According to 1936 articles of The Hollywood Reporter, the role of the female lead in this film was intended for Helen Gahagan Douglas.

Production charts for this film dating to the 1930s seem to contradict other sources. The charts mention acting roles for Dorothy Coburn, George Lollier, and Art Mix. Their possible involvement in the film is not mentioned by other sources. The charts do not credit Cyril Hume and John Twist as screenwriters, but they credit John Francis Larkin. Larkin's involvement is not always mentioned by other sources, and it is unclear if he contributed to the final script. The charts credit John Tribby for the sound recording of the film, while other sources credit Earl A. Wolcott.

Some scenes for this film were reportedly filmed in the vicinity of Sonora, California.

References

External links
 
 
 
 

1936 films
1936 Western (genre) films
Films about kidnapping
Films about singers
American films based on plays
Films directed by Wallace Fox
Films set in California
Films shot in California
Films about mining
RKO Pictures films
Films with screenplays by Cyril Hume
Films produced by Cliff Reid
American Western (genre) films
1930s English-language films
1930s American films